Raval is the surname of the following people:
Anantrai Raval (1912–1988), Indian critic and editor 
Cesar C. Raval (1924–2017), Roman Catholic bishop in the Philippines
Dhruv Raval (born 1988), Indian cricketer 
Estela Raval, Argentine pop latino singer 
Harshida Raval, Indian singer 
Jeet Raval (born 1988), New Zealand Test cricketer
Kirit Raval (died 2005), Indian attorney and Solicitor General of India 
Kishen Raval (born 1990), Industrialist and investor 
Kuldeep Raval (born 1985), Indian cricketer
Nalin Raval (born 1933), Indian poet and short story writer 
PJ Raval, American cinematographer and filmmaker
Prabodh Raval, a leader of Indian National Congress
Praful Raval, Indian teacher, poet, essayist and short story writer
R. D. Raval (1928–1980), Indian artist
Ravishankar Raval (1892–1977), Indian painter, art teacher, art critic, journalist and essayist 
Sebastián Raval (c.1550–1604), Spanish composer

See also
Rawal